Desire the Right is the motto of the Falkland Islands. It makes reference to the Desire, the vessel from which English sea-captain John Davis sighted the Falkland Islands in 1592.

The motto was adopted as the name of a political party which advocated rapprochement with Argentina, the Desire the Right Party, which fielded three candidates in the 1989 general election, although none were elected.

References

History of the Falkland Islands
National mottos